is a 2010 Japanese horror-comedy film starring Junpei Mizobata and Saki Aibu. It was directed by Takeshi Shirakawa.

Plot

Tomokazu Shudo (Junpei Mizobata) has his first ever crush on Sugina Mayama (Saki Aibu), a senior student. Tomokazu has troubles confessing his feelings to the popular student, but one day, he is invited to the research lab where Sugina Mayama works. Tomokazu hopes to use this meeting to express his true feelings for her. To Tomokazu's surprise, when he arrives he first sees a big wooden box in the middle of the dark lab. Sugina tells Tomokazu that he looks scared and then proceeds to push Tomokazu into the box!

While being placed into the box, Tomokazu is told that he will watch a horror movie produced from his mind, with only his neck & head protruding from the box. Tomokazu will be the first test subject for Sugina's "Neck Machine". The device hopes to turn people into monsters from the neck down while watching or thinking horror-related things. The first experiment fails, but Sugina then gets the help of childhood friend Takashi Gori (Yuta Hiraoka), who is now a horror writer named Mataro Echizen.

Cast
 Junpei Mizobata as Tomokazu Shudo
 Saki Aibu as Sugina Mayama
 Sumina Teramoto as young Sugina
 Yuta Hiraoka as Takashi Gori/Mataro Echizen
 Takumi Hanaoka as young Takashi
 Chiaki Kuriyama as Eiko Akasaka
 Kazuma Suzuki as Takeshitaira Yamamo
 Gota Watabe as Koike
 Ayaka Komatsu as Kaori
 Tomomi Kasai as Mao
 Yoichi Nukumizu as Okada
 Shigeki Hosokawa as Meiousei O
 Eiji Bando as Professor Qingtao
 Jiro Sato as Professor Jun
 Miki Honoka as Yukari
 Itsuji Itao as Reporter

References

External links
 Official Website  
  
 
 NECK ネック at JFDB
 

2010 films
2010s Japanese-language films
2010 comedy horror films
Japanese comedy horror films
2010s Japanese films